Daniel Oro (born 12 May 1963) is a Spanish ecologist working as Professor of Research at CEAB-CSIC.

Career
Daniel Oro received his biology degree from the University of Barcelona in 1986, and his doctorate in biology from the same University in 1996. After his PhD, he completed post-doc research stays at CEFE-CNRS (Montpellier) and University of Glasgow (UK). During 2000-2016, he served as Professor at IMEDEA CSIC-University of the Balearic Islands, where he founded the Population Ecology Group. His research interests are in animal demography and population dynamics, as well as behavioural processes in social species.

Most Cited Publications
Coll M, Piroddi C, Steenbeek J, Kaschner K, Ben Rais Lasram F, Aguzzi J, Ballesteros E, Bianchi CN, Corbera J, Dailianis T, Danovaro R. The biodiversity of the Mediterranean Sea: estimates, patterns, and threats. PLOS One. 2010 Aug 2;5(8):e11842. (Cited 1653 times, according to Google Scholar) 
 Oro D, Genovart M, Tavecchia G, Fowler MS, Martínez‐Abraín A. Ecological and evolutionary implications of food subsidies from humans. Ecology letters. 2013 Dec;16(12):1501-14. (Cited 488 times, according to Google Scholar.)  
 Oro D, Cam E, Pradel R, Martínez-Abraín A. Influence of food availability on demography and local population dynamics in a long-lived seabird. Proceedings of the Royal Society B: Biological Sciences 2004 Feb 22;271(1537):387-96. (Cited 212 times, according to Google Scholar.)  
 Bicknell AW, Oro D, Camphuysen K, Votier SC. Potential consequences of discard reform for seabird communities. Journal of Applied Ecology. 2013 Jun;50(3):649-58. (Cited 190 times, according to Google Scholar.)  
 Oro D, Bosch M, Ruiz X. Effects of a trawling moratorium on the breeding success of the Yellow‐legged Gull Larus cachinnans. Ibis. 1995 Oct;137(4):547-9. (Cited 190 times, according to Google Scholar.)

References

External links
 Theoretical and Computational Ecology Laboratory
 Google Scholar, Citation index
 ResearchGate

1963 births
University of Barcelona
Living people